Meyersdale is a borough in Somerset County, Pennsylvania, United States, situated on the Casselman River,  southeast of Pittsburgh.  It is part of the Johnstown, Pennsylvania, Metropolitan Statistical Area.

In the past, Meyersdale's chief industry was the mining of coal.

Meyersdale is located along the Great Allegheny Passage, a multi-use recreational rail trail.

The Pennsylvania Maple Festival has taken place each spring in Meyersdale since 1948.

History

Meyersdale was first settled as early as 1776, but the growth of the town dates from the advent of the first railroad in 1871. Coal mining began in the next year.

The borough was named for an early settler: Peter Meyers, a local farmer who was integral to the beginning of the town. Early names for Meyersdale included Meyers Mills and Dale City. Jacob Olinger had 30 lots laid out on his land in 1844 with Alexander Philson of Berlin serving as the surveyor. Additional lots were laid out in 1852, with M.D. Miller acting as the surveyor, and in 1869, with Kenneth McCloud as surveyor. Around the same time, Peter Meyers had lots laid out on his land and the Beachley family had lots laid out on their land. The Olinger and Beachley lots were organized together in 1872 and named Dale City. The Meyers lots were added in 1874, and the name was changed to Meyersdale. The Amity Reformed Church was organized about 1851, and the Zion Evangelical Lutheran Church in 1852, and both congregations shared a union churchhouse from 1854 until 1875.

In 1981–82, Meyersdale received an All-America City Award from the National Civic League. The Meyersdale Wind Farm began commercial operations in 2003.

The New Colonial Hotel and Second National Bank of Meyersdale are listed on the National Register of Historic Places.

Geography
Meyersdale is surrounded by Summit Township.

Demographics

At the 2000 census there were 2,473 people, 1,019 households, and 666 families residing in the borough. The population density was 2,950.7 people per square mile (1,136.7/km2). There were 1,089 housing units at an average density of 1,299.3 per square mile (500.6/km2).  The racial makeup of the borough was 99.35% White, 0.24% African American, 0.12% Native American, 0.16% Asian, and 0.12% from two or more races. Hispanic or Latino of any race were 0.73%.

Of the 1,019 households, 29.4% had children under the age of 18 living with them, 49.2% were married couples living together, 11.4% had a female householder with no husband present, and 34.6% were non-families. 31.0% of households were one person, and 18.1% were one person aged 65 or older. The average household size was 2.31 and the average family size was 2.89.

In the borough the population was spread out, with 22.2% under the age of 18, 7.5% from 18 to 24, 26.4% from 25 to 44, 21.8% from 45 to 64, and 22.1% 65 or older. The median age was 41 years. For every 100 females there were 84.7 males. For every 100 females age 18 and over, there were 80.9 males.

The median household income was $24,652 and the median family income  was $29,798. Males had a median income of $26,167 versus $18,205 for females. The per capita income for the borough was $14,116. About 16.8% of families and 20.4% of the population were below the poverty line, including 31.4% of those under age 18 and 18.3% of those age 65 or over.

Education
The community is served by the Meyersdale Area School District.  Senior students attend Meyersdale Area High School.

Notable people
 Harry Beal, the first U.S. Navy Seal. A bridge in Meyersdale was named in his honor in 2020.
 Bill Collins, professional golfer.
 William P. Kephart, US Naval Reserve aviator killed in action over Guadalcanal.  The USS Kephart is named in his honor.
 George H. Ramer, received the Medal of Honor—America's highest military award—for his actions during the Korean War.
 John Charles Thomas, opera, operetta and concert baritone.
 Thomas G. Saylor, Chief Justice of the Pennsylvania Supreme Court.

References

Boroughs in Somerset County, Pennsylvania
Populated places established in 1844
1871 establishments in Pennsylvania